Pieter Burmann may refer to:
 Pieter Burman the Elder (1668–1741), Dutch classical scholar
 Pieter Burman the Younger (1714–1778), Dutch philologist